Neil Michael Fachie  (born 12 March 1984) is a Scottish Paralympic multiple sports athlete competing in events for individuals with a visual impairment. Fachie has entered two Paralympics, as a sprinter in the 2008 Games in Beijing and as a tandem cyclist in London 2012. In London he won the gold medal in the Men's individual 1 km time trial and silver in the individual sprint, both with Barney Storey as his sighted pilot.

Career history
Fachie was born in Aberdeen, Scotland in 1984. Fachie, who has a congenital eye condition, retinitis pigmentosa, studied physics at Aberdeen University. There he took up athletics and at the age of 24 he qualified for the 2008 Summer Paralympics in Beijing, running in the 100m and 200m sprints. After failing to take a podium place in either races in China, Fachie decided to change sports to cycling.

The strength Fachie had built up during his time as a sprinter was instrumental in impressing the Great Britain cycle coaches. By September 2008 he was training with the GB Para-Cycling Team and was part of the team by April the following year. In 2009 he entered the Para-Cycling Track World Championships, with Barney Storey as his pilot. The two took the Gold in both the Kilo and Sprint, setting a new world record in the Kilo. In 2011 Fachie travelled to Montichiari, Italy to compete in his second Para-Cycling Track World Championships. This time paired with Craig MacLean, he again achieved gold in both the Kilo and Sprint, setting a new world record in the Sprint.

Fachie entered his third Para-Cycling Track World Championships, this time held in Los Angeles, USA. His pilot in America again was Storey, who would team up with Fachie at the 2012 Summer Paralympics in London. The pair took the silver in the Kilo. That year, in the Paralympics, Fachie and Storey competed in the Men's 1 km time trial for riders with a visual impairment. The pair set a world record time of 1:01.351, and after team mates and main rivals Anthony Kappes and Craig MacLean suffered a mechanical failure, took the gold medal.

Fachie was appointed Member of the Order of the British Empire (MBE) in the 2013 New Year Honours for services to para-cycling. In June 2013, he was awarded an honorary degree from the University of Aberdeen by the Duchess of Rothesay.

Fachie teamed up with Pete Mitchell for the 2014 UCI Para-cycling Track World Championships in Aguascalientes, Mexico. The pair won the gold medal in the tandem 1km time trial, and broke the world record set by Fachie and Storey at the 2012 Paralympics by setting a time of 59.460 seconds, becoming the first tandem pairing to clock a sub-minute time for the kilo time trial. They subsequently won a second gold in the tandem sprint.

Fachie reunited with Craig MacLean for the 2014 Commonwealth Games in Glasgow, where the pairing won double gold in the kilo time trial and sprint B tandem.

Fachie, piloted by Matt Rotherham, successfully defended his kilo time trial and sprint B tandem titles at the 2018 Commonwealth Games in the Gold Coast, Australia.  In doing so he equaled the record for the most number of Commonwealth Gold medals.  He shares the record of 4 golds with sprinter Allan Wells and lawn bowler Alex Marshall.  

At the 2020 Tokyo Paralympics, Fachie won gold in the men's time trial B alongside Rotherham.

He was appointed Officer of the Order of the British Empire (OBE) in the 2022 Birthday Honours for services to cycling.

In 2022 Neil Fachie won Scotland's first gold medal of the Commonwealth Games in the tandem 1 km time trial B event. He also won a silver medal in the tandem sprint B event.

Personal life

He is married to visually impaired English racing cyclist Lora Fachie.

See also
 2012 Olympics gold post boxes in the United Kingdom

References

External links 
 
 

1984 births
Living people
Scottish male cyclists
Scottish track cyclists
Paralympic cyclists of Great Britain
Paralympic gold medalists for Great Britain
Paralympic silver medalists for Great Britain
Athletes (track and field) at the 2008 Summer Paralympics
Cyclists at the 2012 Summer Paralympics
Cyclists at the 2016 Summer Paralympics
Medalists at the 2012 Summer Paralympics
Medalists at the 2016 Summer Paralympics
Medalists at the 2020 Summer Paralympics
Commonwealth Games medallists in cycling
Commonwealth Games gold medallists for Scotland
Cyclists at the 2014 Commonwealth Games
Cyclists at the 2018 Commonwealth Games
UCI Para-cycling World Champions
Sportspeople from Aberdeen
Officers of the Order of the British Empire
Paralympic medalists in cycling
Cyclists at the 2020 Summer Paralympics
Cyclists at the 2022 Commonwealth Games
Commonwealth Games silver medallists for Scotland
Alumni of the University of Aberdeen
Medallists at the 2014 Commonwealth Games
Medallists at the 2018 Commonwealth Games
Medallists at the 2022 Commonwealth Games